"I'm a Thug" is a song by American rapper Trick Daddy, and the second single from his fourth studio album Thugs Are Us (2001). Produced by Righteous Funk Boogie, it peaked at number 17 on the Billboard Hot 100 and is Trick Daddy's second highest-charting song, behind "Let's Go".

Background and composition
The track serves as an ode to Trick Daddy's labelmate Buddy Roe, who at the time was serving a life term in federal prison for possession of cocaine. Lyrically, Trick raps about being perceived as a bad person due to his race and resemblance to a thug, in contrast to who he really is, and condemns the judicial system. The track also features a choir of children singing about being a "thug" with enthusiasm.

Critical reception
Jason Birchmeier of AllMusic cited the song as a highlight of Thugs Are Us.

Music video
The official music video was directed by Nick Quested. In one moment in the video, Trick hands out treats from an ice cream truck to a bunch of kids running toward him.

Charts

References

2001 singles
2001 songs
Trick Daddy songs
Songs written by Trick Daddy
Atlantic Records singles
Songs written by Rafe Van Hoy